Meiganga (Fula: Meiganga 𞤥𞤫𞤭𞤺𞤢𞤲𞤺𞤢) is a town in the Adamawa Province of Cameroon. Its estimated population in 2012 is 41,314.

References 

Populated places in Adamawa Region